Omar Alonso Chávez Carrasco (born January 4, 1990) is a Mexican professional boxer and the one time WBC Youth Intercontinental welterweight champion. He is the son of former three-division world champion of boxing, Julio César Chávez.

Personal life
Omar was born in the city of Culiacán, Sinaloa, Mexico. He is the son of legendary boxing champion Julio César Chávez and his then-wife Amalia Carrasco, and brother of former middleweight champion Julio César Chávez, Jr. Omar's face became known to boxing fans when his father would take him and his older brother, Julio Jr. into the ring as children, before each of Chávez Sr.'s fights.

Professional career
On December 16, 2006 when Chávez was 16 years old he began his professional career, beating fellow debutant Jesús García with a first round knockout on the undercard which included his brother Julio in their native Culiacán. He won his next five straight fights in just over a year, four of them by knockout. Omar is signed with Bob Arum's Top Rank.

On July 18, 2009, Chávez, for the second time would face Marco Antonio Nazareth, who had won four and lost three coming into their bout. In the fourth round Nazareth had received many heavy blows and the referee decided to stop the fight. As Nazareth sat on his stool he collapsed. He was rushed to the local hospital where he underwent a three-hour operation to treat a cerebral hemorrhage, but he died four days later.

Omar has started to improve on his punching power and proved it with a 1st round K.O. of Eugenio Lopez. In September 2011, Chávez beat Alberto Martínez to win the WBC Youth Intercontinental Welterweight Championship.

On December 12, 2011, Omar Chavez faced Jorge Paez Jr, son of Jorge "Maromero" Paez. Although Chavez was looking for the knockout, Paez Jr. was more the boxer and manage to beat Chavez with a unanimous 10-round decision.

Professional boxing record

|- style="margin:0.5em auto; font-size:95%;"
|-  style="text-align:center; margin:0.5em auto; font-size:95%; background:#e3e3e3;"
|  style="border-style:none none solid solid; "|Res.
|  style="border-style:none none solid solid; "|Record
|  style="border-style:none none solid solid; "|Opponent
|  style="border-style:none none solid solid; "|Type
|  style="border-style:none none solid solid; "|Rd., Time
|  style="border-style:none none solid solid; "|Date
|  style="border-style:none none solid solid; "|Location
|  style="border-style:none none solid solid; "|Notes
|- align=center
|Loss|| 36-6-1 || align=left| Ramón Álvarez
|UD || 8 (8) || 2021-06-19 || align=left| 
|align=left|
|- align=center
|Loss|| 36-5-1 || align=left| Jose Carlos Paz
|UD || 10 (10) || 2018-05-19 || align=left| 
|align=left|
|- align=center
|Loss|| 36-4-1 || align=left| Roberto Garcia
|UD || 10 (10) || 2017-08-12 || align=left| 
|align=left|
|- align=center
|Win|| 36-3-1 || align=left| Ramón Álvarez
|TKO || 2 (10) || 2017-04-29 || align=left| 
|align=left|
|- align=center
|Win|| 35-3-1 || align=left| César Chávez
|KO || 1 (8) || 2016-12-10 || align=left| 
|align=left|
|- align=center
|Win|| 34-3-1 || align=left| Hector Muñoz
|MD || 10 (10) || 2015-06-26 || align=left| 
|align=left|
|- align=center
|Win|| 33-3-1 || align=left| Richard Gutierrez
|UD || 8 (8) || 2015-04-18 || align=left| 
|align=left|
|- align=center
|Loss|| 32-3-1 || align=left| Ramón Álvarez
|UD || 10 (10) || 2014-09-27 || align=left| 
|align=left|
|- align=center
|Win|| 32-2-1 || align=left|Joachim Alcine
|UD || 10 (10) || 2013-10-19 || align=left|
|align=left|
|- align=center
|Win|| 31-2-1 || align=left| Daniel Sandoval
|UD || 10 (10) || 2014-05-03 || align=left|
|align=left|
|- align=center
|Win|| 30-2-1 || align=left|Charlie Navarro
|UD || 10 (10) || 2013-07-06 || align=left|
|align=left|
|- align=center
|Win|| 29-2-1 || align=left|Pablo Vasquez
|TKO || 2 (10) || 2013-03-23 || align=left|
|align=left|
|- align=center
|Loss|| 28-2-1 || align=left|Jorge Páez, Jr.
|UD || 10 (10) || July 21, 2012 || align=left|
|align=left|
|- align=center
|Win|| 28-1-1 || align=left|Emilio Julio Julio
|RTD || 9 (10) || March 22, 2012 || align=left|
|align=left|
|- align=center
|Loss|| 27-1-1 || align=left|Jorge Páez, Jr.
|MD || 10 (10) || December 17, 2011 || align=left|
|align=left|
|- align=center
|Win || 27-0-1 || align=left|Alberto Martínez
|TKO || 1 (2:51) || September 9, 2011 || align=left|
|align=left|
|- align=center
|Win || 26-0-1 || align=left|Genaro Trazancos
|TKO || 4 (0:52) || May 28, 2011 || align=left|
|align=left|
|- align=center
|Win || 25-0-1 || align=left|Ignasi Caballero
|KO || 2 (1:34) ||  || align=left|
|align=left|
|- align=center
|Win || 24-0-1 || align=left|Rodrigo Juárez
|KO || 4 (2:47) ||  || align=left|
|align=left|
|- align=center
|Win || 23-0-1 || align=left|Miguel Galindo
|KO || 2 (1:09) || July 24, 2010 || align=left|
|align=left|
|- align=center
|Win || 22-0-1 || align=left|Rodrigo Juárez
|SD || 8 (8) || May 5, 2010 || align=left|
|align=left|
|- align=center
|Win || 21-0-1 || align=left|José Arelis López
|UD || 6 (6) || March 3, 2010 || align=left|
|align=left|
|- align=center
|Win || 20-0-1 || align=left|Eugenio López
|KO || 1 (1:44) || February 20, 2010 || align=left|
|align=left|
|- align=center
|Win || 19-0-1 || align=left|Carlos Urrea
|TKO || 2 (2:39) ||  || align=left|
|align=left|
|- align=center
|Win || 18-0-1 || align=left|James Ventry
|UD || 6 (6) || October 10, 2009 || align=left| 
|align=left|
|- align=center
|Win || 17-0-1 || align=left|Marco Nazareth
|TKO || 4 (2:59) || July 18, 2009 || align=left|
|align=left| 
|- align=center
|Win || 16-0-1 || align=left|Patrick Cape
|TKO || 2 (2:19) || June 20, 2009 || align=left|
|align=left|
|- align=center
|Win || 15-0-1 || align=left|Tyler Ziolkowski
|KO || 2 (1:48) || May 2, 2009 || align=left|
|align=left|
|- align=center
|Win || 14-0-1 || align=left|Rodolfo Armenta
|MD || 4 (4) || February 6, 2009 || align=left|
|align=left|
|- align=center
|Win || 13-0-1 || align=left|Brian Carden
|TKO || 1 (1:50) ||  || align=left|
|align=left|
|- align=center
|Win || 12-0-1 || align=left|Miguel Hernández
|UD || 4 (4) ||  || align=left|
|align=left|
|- align=center
|Win || 11-0-1 || align=left|Jeremy Marts
|KO || 1 (2:44) || August 2, 2008 || align=left|
|align=left|
|- align=center
|style="background: #B0C4DE"|Draw || 10-0-1 || align=left|Miguel Hernández
|MD || 4 (4) || June 21, 2008 || align=left|
|align=left|
|- align=center
|Win || 10-0-0 || align=left|Juan Castíllo
|KO || 1 (2:59) || May 17, 2008 || align=left|
|align=left|
|- align=center
|Win || 9-0-0 || align=left|Marco Nazareth
|UD || 4 (4) || April 26, 2008 || align=left|
|align=left|
|- align=center
|Win || 8-0-0 || align=left|Antonio Valencia
|TKO || 3 (2:40) || March 29, 2008 || align=left|
|align=left|
|- align=center
|Win || 7-0-0 || align=left|Iván García
|TKO || 2 (1:32) ||  || align=left|
|align=left|
|- align=center
|Win ||6-0-0 || align=left|Miguel Camacho
|MD || 4 (4) || February 9, 2008 || align=left|
|align=left|
|- align=center
|Win ||5-0-0 || align=left|Miguel Hernández
|TKO || 1 (1:27) ||  || align=left|
|align=left|
|- align=center
|Win || 4-0-0 || align=left|Enrique Fernández
|KO || 1 (0:29) || May 19, 2007 || align=left|
|align=left|
|- align=center
|Win || 3-0-0 || align=left|Jesús Hernández
|KO || 3 (1:55) || April 28, 2007 || align=left|
|align=left|
|- align=center
|Win || 2-0-0 || align=left|Óscar Sánchez
|TKO || 1 (2:49) || March 31, 2007 || align=left|
|align=left|
|- align=center
|Win  || 1-0-0 || align=left|Jesús García
|KO || 1 (2:00) ||  || align=left|
|align=left|
|- align=center

See also
Notable boxing families

References

External links
 

Boxers from Sinaloa
Sportspeople from Culiacán
Light-welterweight boxers
Welterweight boxers
1990 births
Living people
Mexican male boxers